Minnie Woolsey (1880 – after 1960), billed as Koo-Koo the Bird Girl, was an American side show entertainer, best known for her only film appearance in Tod Browning's film Freaks in 1932.

Biography 
Woolsey was born in 1880 in Rabun County, Georgia. Little is known about her early life, only that she was "rescued" from a mental asylum in Georgia by a travelling showman and was commonly billed as Minnie Ha Ha (a play on Minnehaha) in her sideshow entertainment career. She had a rare congenital growth skeletal disorder called Virchow-Seckel syndrome, which caused her to have a very short stature, a small head, a narrow bird-like face with a beak-like nose, large eyes, a receding jaw, large ears and mild intellectual disability. In addition, Woolsey was bald, toothless, and either completely blind or very short-sighted. She would appear in an American-Indian style bodysuit made of feathers with a single feather on top of her head as her costume and would dance and speak gibberish.

She appeared in the 1932 film Freaks, alongside a cast of other sideshow performers from the time, billed as Koo Koo, the Bird Girl. She was not the original Koo Koo however; the billing was previously used by another performer in the film, a "Stork" or "Bird" woman named Elizabeth Green. Woolsey is seen in many scenes, particularly at the wedding ceremony, where she is seen dancing on the dining table in a feathery costume. In 1942, a news brief in Billboard reported that Woolsey was recovering in Coney Island Hospital after breaking her arm while descending stairs. She was hit by a car in the 1960s. When and how she died is unknown, but accounts show that she was still alive and performing in 1960, working at Coney Island in sideshow/circus, in her 80s.

In popular culture
 The Manchester-based Gypsy folk band Naymedici released a single titled "Koo Koo the Bird Girl" in memory of the entertainer, with a video featuring scenes from Freaks.
 Australian performer Sarah Houbolt created a performance called Kookoo the Bird Girl. Speaking to Disability Arts Online, Houbolt said “My full length show, KooKoo the Birdgirl, is about Minnie Woolsley, a historical performer with disability, who starred in Freaks (1932). This is an art history piece, and a female perspective on the side show. My passion to uncover her story is as a result of the importance of telling our history from a disability perspective. Minnie lived in a time of compulsory sterilisation and anti-marriage laws for disabled women, which not many people know about.”
 She is mentioned in Tom Waits's song Lucky Day (Overture) from his album The Black Rider, about sideshow performers.

See also
Elizabeth Green the Stork Woman

References

External links
Biography at Phreeque.com

1880 births
Sideshow performers
People from Rabun County, Georgia
20th-century deaths
Date of death unknown